Visa requirements for Estonian non-citizens are administrative entry restrictions by the authorities of other states placed on holders of an Estonian alien's passport.


Visa requirements map

Visa-free access
Non-citizens of Estonia may enter the following countries and territories without a visa:

See also

 Visa requirements for Estonian citizens
 Visa requirements for Latvian non-citizens
 Estonian passport

References

Estonian non-citizens
Foreign relations of Estonia